Fergus Cashin (1924–2005) was a British journalist who wrote mostly theatrical reviews.  He wrote a controversial biography of Mae West, but is also known for the ironic phrase "This one will run and run", which he originally used in a review of a play that quickly closed, and which was subsequently made popular by the satirical magazine Private Eye.

Contemporaries knew him as a larger than life, hard-drinking smoker who charmed everybody.  His journalism career ended in the 1970s after an altercation with his editor.  He co-wrote a biography of Richard Burton.  He died in a retirement home in 2005.

References

2005 deaths
British male journalists
1924 births